Jalali is a surname. Notable people with the surname include:

Ahmad Jalali, Iranian scholar and philosopher
Ahmad Reza Jalali, imprisoned Swedish-Iranian doctor and researcher 
Ali Ahmad Jalali, former interior minister of Afghanistan
Aria C Jalali!, solo indie musician
Bahram Jalali, electrical engineer
Bijan Jalali, Iranian modern poet
Kazem Jalali, member of Iran's Majles
Majid Jalali, Iranian football manager and former football player
Mohammad Hossein Jalali, Iranian military personnel
Muhammad Ali Jalali, former governor in Afghanistan
Shakeb Jalali, Pakistani Urdu poet